Eichenberger may refer to:
USS Eichenberger (DE-202), American ship
Eichenberger Bach, German river

As a surname
Marcel Eichenberger, Swiss canoer
Sabine Eichenberger, Swiss canoer
Stefan Eichenberger, Swiss film producer